Bede (famine: Bedeni) or Bedey, also known as Manta, is an Indo-Aryan nomadic ethnic group of Bangladesh. The Bede traditionally live, travel, and earn their living on the river, which has given them the name of "Water Gypsy" or "River Gypsy". Bedes are similar to European gypsies. They travel in groups and never stay in one place for more than a couple of months. The Bedes are a marginalized group. About 98% of Bedes live below the poverty line, and about 95% of Bede children do not attend school. Historically the Bedes were unable to vote as they did not own land, nor could they apply for banks loan or microcredit for the same reason. However, in 2008 the Bedes were able to win their right to vote.

Occupation 
The majority of the Bedes live on snake related trading, such as snake charming (training), snake catching, snake selling, etc. They also sell lucky heathers and herbal medicines, which they claim have magical properties. Bedes' other occupations are in the entertainment services (e.g. monkey shows, magic shows) and petty trading. Many villagers believe in the magical powers of the gypsies. They can make evil spirits leave someone's body according to magical powers. Some of them beg on the busy streets of big cities like Dhaka, Chittagong, Khulna.

Religion and other 
Bedes do not have any kind of formal education and they do not use medical facilities.  Most of them speak Bengali. Most of them are Muslim but also practice Hinduism, Shamanism and Animism along with Islam. They are related to other South Asian nomadic groups, such as the Dom and Buno people.

Gallery

References

Literature

External links
 

Ethnic groups in Bangladesh
Dom in Bangladesh
Romani in Bangladesh